Ares Shipyard is a Turkish shipyard established in Antalya, southern Turkey in 2006. It builds fast patrol boats for the defence and law enforcement missions. This Shipyard Made World Class 'Ares-150 Hercules' OPV. Whice was awarded World's best Offshore patrol Ship By An International Maritime Organisation In 2018 

Ares Shipyard was founded for building of sightseeing boats and yachts by Kalafatoğlu Family of Sürmene in Trabzon, an ancestor seafarer. The shipyard is situated in the Free economic zone of Antalya, and has
five covered buildings of  total area. The company went into defence industry and has been building fast patrol boats and offshore patrol crafts for the coast guard commands of Bahrain, Oman, and Qatar, since 2014, Turkish Coast Guard and Police, and Northern Cyprus Coast Guard.

For the design of the patrol boats, Ares cooperates with the British Maritime Technology (BMT). The shipyard developed an armed unmanned surface vessel equipped with guided missiles for the Turkish Navy in early 2021.

Coast Guard and Navy vessels

References

Shipyards of Turkey
Turkish companies established in 2006
Defence companies of Turkey
Shipbuilding companies of Turkey
Companies based in Antalya